Bromelia balansae is a plant species in the genus Bromelia. This species is native to Argentina, Brazil, Colombia, Bolivia, and Paraguay where it grows at elevations of 150 to 3,000 feet.

Description
Bromelia balansae is a large terrestrial bromeliad somewhat resembling the pineapple.  Bromelias contain green leaves that grow 2–4 feet long with very sharp spines.  When prepared to bloom, the center of the plant becomes bright red and then white prior to releasing an orange fruit - for its flower the plant is known as the "heart of flame," a well-deserved title.  The orange-colored fruit it yields is said to make a cooling drink.  It is the most commonly cultivated bromelia and may be used as fencing due to its large and rapid growth.  It thrives in full sun and is best suited for growing outdoors.

References

balansae
Flora of South America
Plants described in 1891